Emil Benedict Zilliacus (11 January 1921 – 28 January 2013) was a Swedish-speaking Finnish journalist, author, scriptwriter and translator.

Zilliacus was born in Helsinki, Finland.  He wrote screenplays for many  movies, including Etulinjan edessä (Beyond the Front Line), which he wrote together with Stefan Forss.

In the 1950s and 1960s, he wrote a revue for the Swedish theater Lilla Teatern in Helsinki every other year, or sometimes more often; the show became very popular.

Bibliography
Bilderbok för stora barn (1951)
Vi ser på Helsingfors (1952)
Korsetten (1962)
Wärtsilä (1967)
Sex årtionden i pressbilder (1971) (with Hugo Sundström)
Utöar (1975)
Öar, holmar och skär (1977)
100 klipp ur vår dagbok (1977)
Wihelm Wahlforss (1984)
Bergets skugga (1987)
Båten i vassen (1990)
Förlorat och bevarat (1996)

Awards
The Thanks for the Book Award 1991

References

External links
 
 Biografiskt lexikon för Finland. 

1921 births
2013 deaths
Writers from Helsinki
Finnish writers in Swedish
Finnish military personnel of World War II